Broadway Malyan is a global architecture, urbanism and design practice. It was established in 1958 by architects Cyril Broadway and John Malyan.

Among its incorporated businesses globally, it owns or is closely associated with the English incorporated companies Broadway Malyan International Limited, Broadway Malyan Limited and Broadway Malyan Holdings Limited.

Offices
Broadway Malyan's offices are in London (UK), Madrid (Spain), Lisbon (Portugal), Warsaw (Poland), Abu Dhabi (UAE), Singapore, Shanghai (China), Mumbai (India), Dubai (UAE), Manchester (UK) and Birmingham (UK).

Incorporated businesses
Originally a partnership, itself or its partners have created a set of trading and holding English company enterprises in 1989, 1998 and 2005. These are respectively Broadway Malyan International Limited, Broadway Malyan Limited and Broadway Malyan Holdings Limited.

Broadway Malyan is an employee owned practice.

Projects

Retail
Torre Seville, Spain
Costco Stevenage, UK
Lisbon International Airport, Portugal

Workplace
Met Office, Exeter, UK
BP Campus Sunbury, UK
Porto Office Park, Portugal
Ordnance Survey HQ, UK
CIBIS, Jakarta, Indonesia 
Springer Nature HQ, London, UK
Menara Prudential, Kuala Lumpur
Petronas R&T Centre, Turin
HSBC Dubai

Education
Waterlow Hall, South Hampsted High School, UK
ADEC Schools Programme, Abu Dhabi
British Council School, Madrid
Nexus International School, Singapore
Coventry University Alison Gingell Building, UK
Fettes College Guangzhou, China
Chengdu Westminster School, China

Residential
Battersea Reach, London, UK
The Tower, London, UK
Harrington Place, Woking, UK
The Boutiq, Singapore
Mann Island Buildings, Liverpool

Hospitality & Leisure
Moxy Hotel, Lisbon
Tivoli Avenida Liberdade, Lisbon 
Tanjung Arun Eco Development, Malaysia
Taj Crowne Plaza Hotel, London
Miami International Cruise Terminal, USA

Awards
Broadway Malyan has won numerous awards for its work, including:

References

External links
http://www.broadwaymalyan.com - Broadway Malyan's website

Architecture firms of the United Kingdom
Design companies established in 1958
1958 establishments in England